Sinead Burgess (born 10 November 1990) is a Sydney-based singer-songwriter signed to ABC Music and Island Records Australia, which is part of Universal Music Australia. Burgess first began her singing career in 2007 and subsequently released a 5-track EP titled 'You Get Me'; featuring the title track and "Butterflies" which were released as singles and in many compilation albums across Australia.  Burgess's single "Goodnight America" was co-written with UK pop producer Stuart Crichton who has worked with Kylie Minogue, Pet Shop Boys, Bond and The Sugababes. Burgess supported Irish band The Script at a one-off show in Sydney in 2012. Burgess released her single "Rearview Mirrow" digitally in 2013 and then worked on a 6-Track EP titled "Wolf", released as a digital download in 2016.  Burgess since toured with The Shires (duo) on their Accidentally On Purpose tour as a supported act. Burgess released the album "Damaged Goods" on August 17, 2018.

References

External links 

1990 births
Living people
Australian women singer-songwriters
21st-century Australian singers
21st-century Australian women singers